Beta Aquilae, Latinized from β Aquilae, is a triple star system in the equatorial constellation of Aquila. It is visible to the naked eye as a point-like source with an apparent visual magnitude of 3.87. Based on parallax measurements obtained during the Hipparcos mission, it is located at a distance of approximately 44.7 light-years from the Sun. It is drifting closer to the Sun with a radial velocity of −40 km/s.

Its two components are designated Beta Aquilae A (formally named Alshain , the traditional name for the system) and B.

Nomenclature

β Aquilae (Latinised to Beta Aquilae) is the system's Bayer designation. The designations of the two components as Beta Aquilae A and B derive from the convention used by the Washington Multiplicity Catalog (WMC) for multiple star systems, and adopted by the International Astronomical Union (IAU).

The system bore the traditional name Alshain derived from the Perso-Arabic term الشاهين, aš-šāhīn, meaning "the (peregrine) falcon", perhaps by folk etymology from the Persian šāhīn tarāzū (or possibly šāhīn tara zed; see Gamma Aquilae), the Persian name for the asterism α, β and γ Aquilae. In 2016, the IAU organized a Working Group on Star Names (WGSN) to catalogue and standardize proper names for stars. The WGSN decided to attribute proper names to individual stars rather than entire multiple systems. It approved the name Alshain for the component Beta Aquilae A on 21 August 2016 and it is now so included in the List of IAU-approved Star Names.

In the catalogue of stars in the Calendarium of Al Achsasi al Mouakket, this star was designated Unuk al Ghyrab (عنق ألغراب - únuq al-ghuraab), which was translated into Latin as Collum Corvi, meaning the crow's neck.

Namesake
 was a United States navy ship.

Properties
The primary, component A, is of magnitude 3.71 and spectral class G8IV. It has a very low level of surface magnetic activity and may be in a state similar to a Maunder minimum. Since 1943, the spectrum of this star has served as one of the stable anchor points by which other stars are classified. This is an aging subgiant star that has exhausted the supply of hydrogen at its core and is evolving into a giant. It has a mass 26% greater than the Sun's, a luminosity six times that of the Sun, and a radius about thrice solar.

The 12th magnitude secondary companion, designated component B, is a double-lined spectroscopic binary which is 13 arcseconds away in the sky. It has a stellar classification of M2.5 V, matching a class M red dwarf.

In culture

In the Chinese folk tale The Cowherd and the Weaver Girl, Beta and Gamma Aquilae are children of Niulang (牛郎, The Cowherd, Altair) and Zhinü (織女, The Princess, Vega).

The Koori people of Victoria knew Beta and Gamma Aquilae as the black swan wives of Bunjil (Altair), the wedge-tailed eagle.

References

External links
 
 ARICNS
 Beta Aquilae by Professor Jim Kaler.
 Image β Aquilae

G-type subgiants
Aquilae, Beta
Maunder Minimum
Suspected variables
Triple stars
Spectroscopic binaries

Aquila (constellation)
Aquilae, Beta
Durchmusterung objects
Aquilae, 60
0771
188512
098036
7602
Alshain